Georg Lindström (11 June 1898 – 14 April 1960) was a Swedish hurdler. He competed in the men's 110 metres hurdles at the 1920 Summer Olympics.

References

1898 births
1960 deaths
Athletes (track and field) at the 1920 Summer Olympics
Swedish male hurdlers
Olympic athletes of Sweden
Place of birth missing